Open Up and Bleed! is a live album by Iggy and the Stooges that was released in 1995. The copy on the CD cover shows a subtitle – "The Great Lost Stooges Album?" – and suggests a line-up of songs that the band had been performing in their live shows, which might have been collected into a fourth studio album by the band that was never released.

Track listing
The album consisted of 2 types.

All tracks by Iggy Pop and James Williamson except where noted

Type 1
 "Rubber Legs" - 5:22
 "Open Up and Bleed" - 4:55
 "Johanna" - 4:37
 "Cock in My Pocket" - 3:51
 "Head On" (Williamson) - 5:42
 "Cry for Me" - 6:47
 "Rich Bitch" (Pop) - 9:54
 "Wet My Bed" - 5:36
 "I Got Nothing" (Pop) - 4:02
 "Heavy Liquid/New Orleans" - 5:59
 "She Creatures of the Hollywood Hills" - 4:48
 "Rubber Legs" (Version 2) (Williamson) - 5:40

Type 2
 "Death Trip"
 "Head On"
 "Rubber Legs"
 "Radio Advertisement"
 "Raw Power"
 "I'm a Man" (Bo Diddley)
 "Ballad of Hollis Brown" (Bob Dylan)
 "Open Up and Bleed"
 "Johanna"
 "Purple Haze" (Jimi Hendrix)
 "I'm So Glad" (Skip James - Cream)

Personnel 

Iggy Pop – lead vocals
James Williamson – guitar
Ron Asheton – bass, backing vocals
Scott Asheton – drums
Scott Thurston – piano
Technical
Patrick Boissel – remastering
Claude Gassian – photography
Frank Meyer – liner notes
Greg Shaw – graphic design
Mike Wolf – remastering

External links 

 AllMusic review
 Robert Christgau review

Iggy Pop albums
The Stooges albums
1995 live albums